During the 1999–2000 English football season, Millwall F.C. competed in the Football League Second Division, the third tier of English football.

Season summary
Millwall had a good season and finished fifth in the Second Division, qualifying for the play-offs, but were beaten in the semi-finals by Wigan Athletic 1–0 on aggregate. The club also saw failure in both domestic cup competitions, being eliminated from both in the first round.

Final league table

Players

First-team squad

Left club during season

Notes

References

External links
Official Website
Sky Sports
BBC Football

1999–2000
Millwall